42nd Avenue station could refer to:

 42nd Avenue station (TriMet)
 42nd Avenue station (Muni Metro)